Edge City is a syndicated comic strip, begun in 2000.

Edge City also may refer to:

 Edge city, a city-planning concept
 Edge City: Life on the New Frontier, a 1991 book by Joel Garreau
 The fictional settings for works of The Mask franchise:
 In the 1996 comics spinoff series Walter: Campaign of Terror
 In the 1994 film The Mask
 In the 1995-1997 television series The Mask: Animated Series
 A fictional metropolitan area on the Smallville television series (2001-2011)
 The production company for the 1984 film Repo Man

See also 
 List of edge cities
 Edge of the City, a 1957 American film
 The City's Edge, a 1983 Australian film